Zendo may refer to:

 Zendo, a Japanese meditation hall.
 Zendo (game), a game of inductive logic.
 Shan-tao (aka Zendō) an influential Buddhist writer in the 7th Century.